Stochastics and Dynamics (SD) is an interdisciplinary journal published by World Scientific. It was founded in 2001 and covers "modeling, analyzing, quantifying and predicting stochastic phenomena in science and engineering from a dynamical system's point of view". Articles and papers in the journal describe theory, experiments, algorithms, numerical simulation and applications of stochastic phenomena, with a particular focus on random or stochastic ordinary, partial or functional differential equations and random mappings.

Abstracting and indexing 
The journal is abstracted and indexed in:

 Current Mathematical Publications
 Mathematical Reviews
 Science Citation Index-Expanded (SCIE), including the Web of Science
 CompuMath Citation Index(CMCI)
 ISI Alerting Services
 Current Contents/Physical, Chemical & Earth Sciences (CC/PC&ES)
 Zentralblatt MATH

References 

Mathematics journals
Publications established in 2001
English-language journals
World Scientific academic journals